Denisa Smolenová (born 14 February 1989 in Bratislava) is a Slovak swimmer who competes in the women's butterfly. At the 2012 Summer Olympics she finished 28th overall in the heats in the women's 100 metre butterfly and failed to reach the final.  She also competed in the 200 m butterfly, again not making the final.  She had previously competed in the 200 m butterfly at the 2008 Summer Olympics.

References 

1989 births
Living people
Sportspeople from Bratislava
Slovak female swimmers
Olympic swimmers of Slovakia
Swimmers at the 2008 Summer Olympics
Swimmers at the 2012 Summer Olympics
Female butterfly swimmers